The men's triple jump was one of four jumping events on the Athletics at the 1896 Summer Olympics programme. There were 7 competitors from 5 nations in the triple jump, then known as the "hop, skip, and jump" despite the wide range of techniques used by the competitors. The event was held on 6 April, immediately after the first heats of the 100 metre race. Since there was only one round of the triple jump, the winner was crowned as the first modern Olympic champion.

Background

This was the first appearance of the event, which is one of 12 athletics events to have been held at every Summer Olympics. There were 11 entrants, but only 7 men actually started.

Competition format

There was a single round of jumping. There were no rules on the jumps allowed. "The styles of the medalists were described in The Field as follows: Connolly took two hops on his right foot and then a jump; Tuffèri performed a hop, step and a jump in the standard English method; and Persakis used two steps and a jump."

Records

There were no standing world records (the IAAF began ratifying records in 1912) or Olympic records (as this was the first Games) before the event. James Brendan Connolly set the initial Olympic record at 13.71 metres.

Schedule

The exact time of the contest is not known; it was the second event of the Games. The first day began with the arrival of the King and a brief opening ceremony at 3 p.m., followed by the first round of the 100 metres before the triple jump began.

Results

References

Sources
  (Digitally available at la84foundation.org)
  (Excerpt available at la84foundation.org)
 

Men's jump triple
Triple jump at the Olympics